Alexandrium ostenfeldii, also known as the sea fire, is a species of dinoflagellates.  It is among the group of Alexandrium species that produce toxins causing paralytic shellfish poisoning. These organisms have been found in the Baltic Sea.

References

Gonyaulacales